Shalta is a village in the Sokuluk District of Chüy Region of Kyrgyzstan. Its population was 1,638 in 2021. Among notable people born in Shalta are Dyuishenkul Shopokov (1915-1941), Hero of the Soviet Union,  Sarybay Kudaybergenov (1925-1982), Linguist, Doctor of Philology, and Orozbek Kutmataliev (1932), Akyn, People's Artist of Kyrgyz Republic.

References

Populated places in Chüy Region